John Calvin Giddings (September 26, 1930 – October 24, 1996) was a professor of chemistry specialist of chromatography and separation techniques at the University of Utah.

He earned his Ph.D. under the guidance of Henry Eyring in 1954 and is credited with the invention of the field flow fractionation technique.

He was twice nominated for a Nobel Prize in 1984 and 1994.

On May 27, 1987 Giddings received an honorary doctorate from the Faculty of Pharmacy at Uppsala University, Sweden

Besides being an exceptional scientist, he was also a passionate outdoor sportive practicing climbing and kayaking in Utah and a fervent defender of the environment.

He died prematurely of cancer in 1996.

Selected works
 J. Calvin Giddings (1965). Dynamics of Chromatography. Marcel Decker, NY.
 J. Calvin Giddings (1991). Unified Separation Science. John Wiley & Sons, NY.

References

University of Utah faculty
1996 deaths
1930 births
People from American Fork, Utah